Jim Stovall (born August 3, 1958) is an American writer best known for his bestselling novel The Ultimate Gift. The book was made into the movie The Ultimate Gift, distributed by 20th Century Fox. The Ultimate Gift has a prequel called The Ultimate Life and a sequel called The Ultimate Legacy.

Stovall is blind and is an advocate on behalf of people with blindness.  He works to make television and movies accessible to the blind as President of the Narrative Television Network, an organization that has received various award recognitions including an Emmy award, a Media Access Award, and an International Film and Video Award.

He was chosen as the International Humanitarian of the Year, joining Jimmy Carter, Nancy Reagan, and Mother Teresa as recipients of this honor.

He has also received an Honorary Doctorate of Law from ORU for his work with the disabled.

In the book, Forbes Great Success Stories: Twelve Tales of Victory Wrested from Defeat by Alan Farnham, Malcolm Stevenson "Steve" Forbes Jr., president and CEO of Forbes magazine, said "Jim Stovall is one of the most extraordinary men of our era."

References

External links 
 http://ra.okstate.edu/Tul_Campus/WritingOutLoud/JimStovall/video.htm

1958 births
20th-century American novelists
21st-century American novelists
American male novelists
American blind people
American disability rights activists
Living people
Oral Roberts University alumni
20th-century American male writers
21st-century American male writers